Chiang Hung, Sipsongpanna or Keng Hung was one of the states of Shans under the suzerainty of Burma and China.

Chiang Hung was inhabited mainly by Tai Lü people, a branch of the Shans or Tai, hence its other name Meung Lu. Its capital was the city of Chiang Hung, modern Jinghong. The kingdom, in its most powerful state in the 13th century, covered a large area before being subjugated by neighboring powers such as the Yuan dynasty, the Lan Na kingdom, and the Konbaung dynasty. Chinese dynasties recognized the local leaders as tusi of Cheli.

History
The history of the state can be divided in two periods:
Early Period 1180 - 1290
Chao Phaya Chueang (Pa Zhen) 1180 - 1192
Khai Loeung (Ka Leng) 1192 - 12..
Thao Ai  p. 1290
Later Period (State under Chinese suzerainty until annexation) 1312 - 1805

Early history

Phanya Coeng, Paya Jueang or Chao Jueang Han was said to wage wars with the native Akha and other Tai peoples in the area and established the kingdom in favor of Tai Lü people at Chiang Hung or Heo Kam on the Mekong in 1180. In the early 13th century, King Inmueng greatly expanded Heokam territories. The tributaries of Heokam kingdom includes Kengtung (Meuang Khün), Chiang Saen (Ngoenyang), Meuang Thaeng (modern Dien Bien Phu – the capital of Tai Dam people), and Xieng Thong (Luang Prabang), making Heokam the sole leader of Tai kingdoms in the north. The Tai Lü people then began scattering throughout Heokam’s area of influence.

However, Heokam then fell to the Mongol invasions in 1290 and became a tributary of Yuan dynasty. After a rebellion and subsequent capture of the city by King Mangrai, the Mongols made a peace agreement and the city remained under Mangrai's rule.  The Mongols granted the title Chao Saenwi Fa and the surname of Dao to the Kings of Chiang Hung. The power vacuum in the area was filled by newly formed Lanna kingdom evolving from Ngoenyang state. Mangrai the Great of Lanna put Chiang Hung under Lanna tributary. However, Lanna authority weakened in the early 16th century and Heokam enjoyed a brief period of autonomy until Lanna was conquered by Burmese Toungoo dynasty in 1558. The Burmese under Bayinnaung had already put the area under its control and Chiang Hung became a Burmese tributary. The Burmese divided Heokam into twelve pans (administration units), translated by the Tai Lü people Sipsong Panna (i.e. Twelve districts). Sipsong Panna served as the battlegrounds between Burma and the Qing dynasty.

Heokam faced three centuries of Burmese rule. In efforts to recover the manpower taken by Burma, Buddha Yodfa Chulalok ordered Prince Adthavorapaño of Nan to invade Kengtung and Chiang Hung to gather the Tai peoples there into Nan and other Lanna cities. Today, Nan hosts the largest Tai Lue community in Thailand. Also King Kawila of Chiang Mai invaded Chiang Hung to get the people. The Tai Lue people and culture therefore surged into Lanna.

Dynastic struggle

A dynastic struggle in 1847 brought chaos to Chiang Hung. According to Siamese chronicles King Mahawan of Chiang Hung died in 1847, to be succeeded by his son Prince Sarawan. However, Mahawan's uncle Prince Mahakhanan took the throne. Prince Sarawan fled to Dali in dismay and sought supports from Qing dynasty. Sarawan returned and killed Mahakhanan, Mahakhanan's son, Prince Nokam, went to Ava to gain supports from Pagan Min. The Burmese invaded and took Chiang Hung - culminating a large Tai Lue emigration into Lanna. Prince Nokam was then crowned but was later killed by his own nobles. Ava then re-installed Sarawan as the king.

Sarawan's brother, Oalnawudh, fled to Luang Prabang and proceeded to Bangkok in 1852. The Siamese nobles then saw this as an opportunity to gain control over Shan States and Chiang Hung and planned to take Kengtung on the way to Chiang Hung. The Siamese invaded the north but were unable to penetrate the mountainous highlands. In 1855, another attempt was made to march to Chiang Hung but yet failed.

Later history and legacy
Chiang Hung then came under the suzerainty of Qing dynasty for about a century. After the Chinese Empire was overthrown, the kingdom status of Chiang Hung technically ended. However, Republic of China continued to recognize local leaders as tusi. The last chieftain of Jinghong, Dao Shixun, attended the foundation ceremony of the People's Republic of China in 1949, and later became president of the Yunnan Minzu Institute. Xishuangbanna Dai Autonomous Region was established in 1953 and became an autonomous prefecture in 1955. A former tusi of Mengpeng, Shao Cunxin, was the head of Xishuangbanna government from 1953 to 1992.

Following constant warfare in the late 18th century, a large number of Tai Lue people were displaced. Nowadays some Tai Lue settlements can be found in the northern provinces of Thailand and Laos.

Some members of the ruling family, such as Dao Shixun's brother, fled to Mae Sai district in Chiang Rai, Thailand in 1949. Dao Shixun visited them in 1986.

Bibliography
Fred. W. Carey. A Trip to the Chinese Shan States The Geographical Journal Vol. 14, No. 4 (Oct., 1899), pp. 378-394
Henry Rodolph Davies. Yün-nan: The Link Between India and the Yangtze, Cambridge University Press, 2010 
Charles Patterson Giersch, Asian Borderlands: The Transformation of Qing China's Yunnan Frontier, Harvard University Press, 2006

See also
Shan States
Tai peoples
Köng-ma, one of the largest Chinese Shan States

References

External links
The Shan

Tai history
Former countries in Chinese history
Former countries in Southeast Asia
Shan States
Tusi in Yunnan